William Sherman Rodgers (December 5, 1922 – May 13, 2002) was a Major League Baseball right fielder who played for the Pittsburgh Pirates in 1944 and 1945.

Rodgers is one of many ballplayers who only appeared in the major leagues during World War II.  He made his major league debut on September 27, 1944 in a road game against the Boston Braves at Braves Field.  He played in one more game that season, and in his one appearance in right field recorded no chances.  Rodgers played in just one big league game in 1945 (April 21), going 1-for-1 as a pinch hitter against the Chicago Cubs at Forbes Field.

In a career total of three games he was 2-for-5 (.400) with one run scored.  On November 5, 1946 he was drafted by the New York Yankees from the Pirates in the 1946 minor league draft, but never again made it to the major leagues.

Rodgers died at the age of 79 in Worcester, Massachusetts.

References

External links

Retrosheet

Major League Baseball right fielders
Baseball players from Harrisburg, Pennsylvania
Pittsburgh Pirates players
1922 births
2002 deaths
Albany Senators players
Beaumont Exporters players
Binghamton Triplets players
Hornell Maples players
Newark Bears (IL) players